Fibroblast growth factor 16 is a protein which in humans is encoded by the FGF16 gene.

Function 
The protein encoded by this gene is a member of the fibroblast growth factor (FGF) family. FGF family members possess broad mitogenic and cell survival activities, and are involved in a variety of biological processes, including embryonic development, cell growth, morphogenesis, tissue repair, tumor growth and invasion. The rat homolog is predominantly expressed in embryonic brown adipose tissue and has significant mitogenic activity, which suggests a role in proliferation of embryonic brown adipose tissue.

Mutations in this gene have been found associated to cases of X-linked recessive metacarpal 4/5 fusion.

References